Nucula dunedinensis is a saltwater nut clam, a marine bivalve mollusc in the family Nuculidae.

References
 Powell A. W. B., New Zealand Mollusca, William Collins Publishers Ltd, Auckland, New Zealand 1979 

Nuculidae
Bivalves of New Zealand
Bivalves described in 1928
Taxa named by Harold John Finlay